Wolf Wetzel (born 1956) is a German author, journalist and publicist. He is the author of several books and publishes in various media, including Der Freitag, junge Welt, and NachDenkSeiten. He wrote at Rubikon from its foundation in 2017 until his departure in 2018. Wetzel has also been a deputy board member of Business Crime Control since 2011.

Works 

 Krieg ist Frieden – Über Bagdad, Srebrenica, Genua, Kabul nach …. Unrast, Münster 2002, .
 Tödliche Schüsse – Eine dokumentarische Erzählung. Unrast, Münster 2008, .
 as publisher: Aufstand in den Städten. Unrast, Münster 2012, .
 Der NSU-VS-Komplex – Wo beginnt der Nationalsozialistische Untergrund – wo hört der Staat auf. 3. Auflage. Unrast, Münster 2015, .
 Der Rechtsstaat im Untergrund |Big Brother, der NSU-Komplex und notwendige Illoyalität. PapyRossa Verlag, Köln 2015, .

External links 

 Literature from and about Wolf Wetzel in the German National Library
 Personal website (in German)

References 

1956 births
Living people
German male writers